Naples is a city in Collier County, Florida, United States. As of the 2020 census, the population of the historical city (i.e. in the immediate vicinity of downtown Naples) was 19,115. Naples is a principal city of the Naples-Marco Island, Florida Metropolitan Statistical Area, which had a population of about 375,752 as of 2020.  Naples' USPS City population (i.e. the total population that lists Naples as the city on their postal address and who consider themselves residents of Naples) includes most of the communities in Collier County with the notable exceptions of Immokalee, Marco Island, Ave Maria, Everglades City and a few others, and thus Naples' USPS City population is approximately 333,083.      

The city is mostly known for its high-priced homes, white-sand beaches, and numerous golf courses. Naples is the self-titled "Golf Capital of the World", as it has the second most holes per capita out of all communities, and the most holes of any city in Florida. The city is also known for being appealing to retirees, and a large percent of the population is made up of them.

History 
Before the period of European colonization, the indigenous Calusa lived in Florida (including the region of present-day Naples) for thousands of years, from Charlotte Harbor to Cape Sable. In 1513, Spanish conquistador Juan Ponce de León explored the region and encountered the Calusa, who resisted attempts by de León to establish a Spanish colony in Florida. This initiated nearly two hundred years of conflict between the Spanish and the Calusa. In the early 18th century, following slave raids from Muscogee and Yamasee raiders allied with European settlers in Carolina, the majority of the remaining Calusa moved south and east to escape the raids.

The city of Naples was founded in 1886 by former Confederate general and Kentucky U.S. Senator John Stuart Williams and his partner, Louisville businessman Walter N. Haldeman, the publisher of the Louisville Courier-Journal. Throughout the 1870s and 1880s, magazine and newspaper stories ran stories about the area's mild climate and abundant fish and likened it to the sunny Italian peninsula. The name Naples caught on when promoters described the bay as "surpassing the bay in Naples, Italy". By the summer of 1888, Naples had a population of about 80 people, and the first hotel opened in 1889. Major development was anticipated after Collier County was established in 1923, the completion of the Seaboard Air Line Railroad extension in 1927, and the completion of the Tamiami Trail linking Naples to Miami in 1928, but did not begin until after the 1929 Stock market crash, the Great Depression, and World War II. During the war the U.S. Army Air Forces built a small airfield and used it for training purposes; it is now the Naples Municipal Airport.

After a hurricane in 1945, a fill was required to repair the damage. A local dredging company, Wyatt Brothers, created a lake north of 16th Avenue S, between Gordon Drive and Gulf Shore Boulevard. That same year, Naples officially became a city.

Today, the Wyatt family is credited with the construction of Naples' first beach. Additional channels were eventually added to the south of 14th Avenue S and are named alphabetically for local water birds. The first channel south of 14th Avenue S is Anhinga Channel, then Bittern Channel is south of 15th Avenue S, Crane Channel is south of 16th Avenue S, Duck Channel is south of 17th Avenue S, and Egret Channel is north of 21st Avenue S. From the channels there are coves named Flamingo, Gull, Heron, and Ibis, as well as the original Aqua Cove. These initial channels, canals, and coves were dredged and bulldozed from the mangrove swamps. Where shallow rock precluded digging, the land was filled to create lots with navigable water.

The Aqualane Shores Association was incorporated as a non-profit corporation on February 3, 1966. It served lot owners in the area roughly bounded by the Bay of Naples to the east, Gordon Drive to the west, and the land between 14th Avenue and 21st Avenue S, as well as Marina Drive, Forrest Lane, and Southwinds Drive. Thirty years later, in 1996, a state-mandated city master plan renamed the area the Aqualane Shores Neighborhood and extended its boundary west to the Gulf of Mexico, east to the Bay of Naples, and the area from 14th Avenue S all the way south to Jamaica Channel. The numerous canals and waterfront homes add a distinctive feature to the south portion of Naples and provide access to the Gulf of Mexico for many homeowners.

Geography 

Naples is located in southwest Florida at (26.139, −81.795) on U.S. Highway 41 between Miami to the east and Fort Myers to the north.

Hurricanes 
National Weather Service records that date back to 1851, indicate 74 tropical storms have passed within 85 nautical miles of Naples, or once every 2.2 years (as of a 2014 data).

2005 Hurricane Wilma (Category 5) – Wilma reached maximum wind strength of 185 mph but its winds were 125 mph when it made landfall near Cape Romano (below Naples, just beyond the southwestern tip of Marco Island and northwest of the Ten Thousand Islands in Collier County). Wilma caused 87 deaths and $22.4 billion in damage.

2017 Hurricane Irma (Category 5) – Irma had maximum wind strength of 180 mph but when it made landfall near Marco Island, its winds were 115 mph. As Irma hit Florida, tropical-storm-force winds extended out to 400 miles from the center and had hurricane-force winds that extended up to 80 miles. This storm left over 7.5 million homes (70% of the state) without electricity for days. Irma caused 134 deaths and $50 billion in damage.

2022 Hurricane Ian (Category 4) - Ian had a maximum wind stregth of 216 mph (348 km/h) while approaching Florida, however as it made landfall at Cayo Costa sustained winds measured only 150 mph. Power was lost to much of the Naples, FL area including Pelican Bay and Bay Colony for several days, but repairs began to allow power to be turned back on starting on October 1, 2022. Ian caused 146 deaths in the state of Florida and an estimated $989 million in damages to the city of Naples and approximately $2.2 billion in damages to buildings in Collier County.

Climate
Naples experiences a tropical savanna climate (Köppen climate classification Aw). Naples is normally frost-free and the growing season is 365 days.  Of the two tropical seasons, Naples' wet season is from approximately June through September with frequent afternoon rains, while the dry season is from approximately October through May.  Of the six ecological seasons, Naples experiences only two: Vernal (spring) from approximately October through May and Estival (high summer) from approximately June through September.  Within the Vernal (spring) season, October, November, February, March, April and May are mild temperate, while December and January are cool temperate.  Of the six ecological seasons, Naples does not experience Prevernal (pre-spring), Serotinal (late summer), Autumnal (autumn) and Hibernal (winter) because its trees and vegetation are in a perpetual state of leaf replenishment and bloom; and large numbers of bird species are settled in Naples year-round.

Demographics

2020 census

As of the 2020 United States census, there were 19,115 people, 10,797 households, and 6,441 families residing in the city.

2010 census
As of the 2010 census, there were 19,537 people, 9,710 households, and 6,568 families residing in the city. The racial makeup of the city was 94.1% White, 4.5% Black, 0.12% Native American, 0.33% Asian, 0.02% Pacific Islander, 0.30% from other races, and 1.0% from two or more races. Hispanic or Latino of any race were 4.5% of the population. The largest self-identified ancestry/ethnic groups in Naples were German-American 20.0%, English-American 19.2%, Irish-American 17.8% and Italian-American 9.2%.

There were 9,708 households, out of which 10.9% had children under the age of 18 living with them, 53.8% were married couples living together, 5.0% had a female householder with no husband present, and 39.2% were non-families. Thirty-four percent of all households were made up of individuals, and 20.1% had someone living alone who was 65 years of age or older. The average household size was 1.92 and the average family size was 2.38.

In the city, the population was spread out, with 10.9% under the age of 18, 2.3% from 18 to 24, 14.5% from 25 to 44, 30.0% from 45 to 64, and 42.3% who were 65 years of age or older. The median age was 61 years. For every 100 females, there were 86.0 males. For every 100 females aged 18 and over, there were 83.9 males.

The median income for a household in the city was $71,553, and the median income for a family was $102,262. Males had a median income of $86,092 versus $30,948 for females. The per capita income for the city was $61,141. About 3.1% of families and 5.9% of the population were below the poverty line, including 15.1% of those under age 18 and 3.3% of those aged 65 or over.

Economy 
The economy of Naples is based largely on tourism and was historically based on real estate development and agriculture. Due to its proximity to the Everglades and Ten Thousand Islands, Naples is also popular among ecotourists.

Companies based in Naples include ACI Worldwide, Beasley Broadcast Group, ASG Technologies, and Arthrex, a global medical device company, in addition to numerous small businesses. Due to the wealth present in Collier County, Naples is also home to many small non-profit organizations. The surrounding Naples metro area is also home to major private employers such as Fortune 1000 company Health Management Associates and technology company NewsBank.

In 2009, Naples placed 10th in a report by U.S. News & World Report titled "10 Pricey Cities That Pay Off." The report ranked cities by its "amenity value," a measurement based on the amount of satisfaction an asset brings to its owner. In 2012, a report by Kiplinger ranked Naples with the sixth-highest per capita income in the country, along with the second-highest proportion of millionaires per capita in the US.

Arts and culture

Area attractions 
Tourism is a major industry for the city. The Naples area is home to several major land reserves, including the Corkscrew Swamp Sanctuary, Everglades National Park, Big Cypress National Preserve, Florida Panther National Wildlife Refuge, Ten Thousand Islands National Wildlife Refuge, and Picayune Strand State Forest. The Corkscrew Swamp Sanctuary is known not only for its  of landscape and wildlife, but for a two-and-a-half-mile-long boardwalk winding through the sanctuary. The Naples area is also home to the Naples Zoo at Caribbean Gardens, which dates back to 1919. Near the zoo is where the Coastland Center is located, an indoor mall with many different types of stores anchored by J. C. Penney and Macy's.

Downtown Naples is home to The Naples Players, the 5th Avenue South, and 3rd Street South shopping districts, which feature a variety of antique luxury shops. Gallery Row is a concentration among the numerous art galleries spread throughout the downtown area. Located directly off of Tamiami Trail are the Waterside Shops, an upscale open-air shopping center with popular stores such as Gucci and Louis Vuitton. Near downtown Naples Bay and the Gordon River is the shopping district of Tin City. This open-air shopping center specializes in antiques and handmade local novelties.

The Naples Half Marathon is a half marathon held every year in Naples since 1989, with record participation in 2013 of 2,038 runners. The race has been called one of the best half-marathons in the United States by Runner's World magazine.

Points of interest 

 Naples Botanical Garden
 Naples Depot Museum
 Naples Zoo
 Palm Cottage
Coastland Center
Venetian Village
Waterside Shops
Golisano Children's Museum of Naples

Performing arts
Naples is home to The Naples Players, Naples Shakespeare Festival (and sister company Marco Island Shakespeare Festival), Opera Naples, the Equity Theatre Companies Theatre Zone, and Gulfshore Playhouse. The Naples Philharmonic and The Baker Museum are located at Artis—Naples, which also serves as the educational campus for the Naples Philharmonic Youth Orchestra, Youth Chorus, Youth Jazz Orchestra and Youth Symphony. The Holocaust Museum and Education Center of Southwest Florida educates about 155,000 students each year both in its facility and with a locally traveling exhibit.

Sports 
The last LPGA golf tournament played each year, the CME Group Tour Championship, has been held in Naples since 2012. Since 2013, it has been played at the Gold Course of the Tiburón Golf Club. It claims the largest purse and the largest winner's share of any women's golf tournament, presently $5,000,000 and $1,500,000 respectively. The purse and winner's share increase in 2022, to $7,000,000 and $2,000,000 respectively.

Pickleball is an increasingly popular sport in Naples. Because of this, many parks have added pickleball courts. Naples is home to the U.S. Open Pickleball Championships, which have been held annually since 2016.

Naples has a semi-pro soccer team, Naples United FC, which was founded in 2017. They currently play in the Sunshine Conference of the National Premier Soccer League.

Naples is also the home of swamp buggy races, held three times each year at the Florida Sports Park. The swamp buggy was invented in Naples.

Parks and recreation
In 2005, Naples was voted the best all-around beach in America by the Travel Channel.

Naples area beaches include:

 Delnor-Wiggins Pass State Park
 Clam Pass Beach Park
 Naples Pier
 Vanderbilt Beach
 North Gulfshore Boulevard Beach
 Seagate Beach
 Lowdermilk Beach Park

Education 
Naples is served by the District School Board of Collier County and various private institutions, including the following:

 St. Elizabeth Seton School (private)
 Naples High School (City of Naples, public)
 Barron G. Collier High School (public)
 Gulf Coast High School (public)
 St. John Neumann High School (private)
 Golden Gate High School (public)
 Lely High School (public)
 Palmetto Ridge High School (public)
 Community School of Naples (private)
 Seacrest Country Day School (private)
 First Baptist Academy (private)
 Mason Classical Academy (charter)
 Lorenzo Walker Technical High School (public)
 Naples Christian Academy (private)
 Saint Ann School (private)
 Naples Classical Academy (charter)

Colleges and universities 
While no colleges are based within the city limits, Ave Maria School of Law is located in Vineyards, and Florida SouthWestern State College has a satellite campus in Lely Resort. Also, Florida Gulf Coast University operates continuing education classes from their Downtown Naples campus, and Hodges University has a campus in North Naples.  Higher education institutions close to Naples include:

 Ave Maria University (35 miles northeast of Naples)
 Florida SouthWestern State College (30 miles northwest of Naples)
 Hodges University (35 miles north of Naples)
 Florida Gulf Coast University (8 miles northeast of Naples)

Infrastruture

Transportation

Road 
Since February 2001, Naples has been served by several bus routes operated by the Collier Area Transit. Service runs seven days a week and end times depend on the route. Highways that pass through Naples are I-75 and US-41.

Air 
The city is served by the Naples Airport, and although it doesn't have any scheduled commercial service, it is one of the busiest private jet airports in the United States. The closest airport with regular-scheduled commercial service for both domestic and international destinations is Southwest Florida International Airport.

Healthcare 
The region is served by the NCH Healthcare System, which currently has 716 beds between two hospitals, and Physician's Regional Healthcare System, which has two hospitals that contain 201 beds and is owned by the Health Management Associates, headquartered in Pelican Bay. In addition to the two hospitals, the company operates six clinics in Naples.

Healthcare Network of Southwest Florida (HCN) was founded in 1977 to serve migrant farmworkers and their families in Immokalee. It now provides care to over 41,000 residents of Collier County through 20 practices, including internal medicine, family practice, obstetrics, gynecology, pediatrics, behavioral health and dental care.

Notable people 
 Bill Bain, management consultant, founder of Bain & Company
 Obe Blanc, member of 2010 U.S. Freestyle Wrestling World Team
 Ben Bova, award-winning science fiction author and science author
 Hayden Buckley, professional golfer
 Mary Carillo, former professional tennis player, now a sportscaster
 Michael Collins (1930–2021), Apollo 11 Command Module Pilot
 Robin Cook, author
 Mike Ditka, former NFL player and coach, part-time Naples resident
 Glennon Doyle, author, blogger, and activist
 Keith Eloi, 2003 Lely high graduate, wide receiver in the UFL and AFL
 Dominic Fike, rapper
J. Dudley Goodlette (born 1948), politician and lawyer
 Earnest Graham, former NFL running back for the Tampa Bay Buccaneers
 Garnet Hathaway, born in Naples and plays for the Washington Capitals
 Carlos Hyde, current NFL running back, part of the Naples High graduation class of 2009
 Sonny Jurgensen, NFL Hall of Fame quarterback 
 Shahid Khan, Pakistani-American billionaire, owner of the Jacksonville Jaguars, English soccer club Fulham and Flex-N-Gate
 John Kruk, Major League Baseball player and broadcaster (Philadelphia Phillies)
 Mickey Kuhn, child actor
 Denny Laine, first lead singer of The Moody Blues, Ginger Baker's Airforce, and Paul McCartney and Wings
 John Legere, former CEO of T-Mobile, purchased a Naples mansion in 2019
 Alex Lifeson, rock musician, has a home in Naples
 John Lodge, British musician for The Moody Blues, bought a home in Naples in 2015
 Fred McCrary, former NFL player, graduated from Naples High School in 1991
 James Morgan, scenic designer and Producing Artistic Director of the York Theatre
 Earl Morrall, two-time Super Bowl champion and former NFL quarterback, died in 2014
 Piotr Nowak, former soccer player and head coach of United States U-23 men's national soccer team, D.C. United and Philadelphia Union
 Jake O'Connell, former NFL tight end that went to Gulf Coast High School
 Drew O'Keefe, U.S. Attorney for the Eastern District of Pennsylvania, had a residence in Naples
 Chris Resop, former MLB pitcher
 Rick Scott, U.S. Senator and former Governor of Florida
 Richard M. Schulze, businessman, best known as the founder of Best Buy
 Bob Seger, musician who has a residence in Naples
 Judith Sheindlin, better known to the public as Judge Judy, author and television personality (Pelican Bay)
 Donna Summer, entertainer; died at her Naples home in 2012
 Peter Thomas, the narrator of television programs
 Margit Varga, artist, gallerist, art director
 Abby Wambach, a former professional soccer player, has a home in Naples
 Jesse Witten, professional tennis player

In popular culture 
Many movies have been filmed in or around Naples, such as Still Green, Just Cause, Pick-Up and Thunder and Lightning.

See also

References

External links 

 City of Naples official website
 Naples, Marco Island, Everglades – Convention and Visitors Bureau website

 
Beaches of Florida
Cities in Collier County, Florida
Populated coastal places in Florida on the Gulf of Mexico
Seaside resorts in Florida
Cities in Florida
Beaches of Collier County, Florida
1886 establishments in Florida
Populated places established in 1886